The Exchequer and Audit Departments Act 1866 is the UK Act of Parliament under which most of the revenue from taxation, and all other money payable to the Exchequer, must be paid into the Consolidated Fund.

The act "established a cycle of accountability for public funds": Public spending was authorised by the House of Commons while the public fund was controlled by the Comptroller and Auditor General who was also responsible for auditing the financial accounts produced by each government department. The Committee of Public Accounts, which had been established in 1861 by William Gladstone, was appointed to oversee the work of the Comptroller.

Comptroller and Auditor General

The act combined the functions of two historical job functions:
the Comptroller General of the Exchequer, who had authorised the issue of public monies to departments since 1834; 
the Commissioners of Audit, who had traditionally presented the government accounts to the Treasury. 

Under the terms of the act the 'Comptroller and Auditor General' continued to authorise the issue of money to departments (the comptroller function) and was given the new task of examining departmental accounts and reporting the results to Parliament.

References

United Kingdom public law
United Kingdom Acts of Parliament 1866
Legal history of England
1866 in economics
Taxation in the United Kingdom